The Wadere were an indigenous Australian people of the Northern Territory.

Country

Alternative names
 Wadiri, Waderi

Notes

Citations

Sources

Aboriginal peoples of the Northern Territory